Euthamia occidentalis is a flowering plant, known by the common names western flat topped goldenrod, western goldentop and western goldenrod, in the family Asteraceae.

Description
Euthamia occidentalis is a scrubby perennial plant with many green stems which age into a dull brownish-green, and green small leaves. It has plentiful yellowish clusters of flowers. Flowers bloom July to November.

Distribution and habitat
It is a common plant of western North America, from British Columbia and Alberta, the Western United States (from the Pacific as far east as Montana, Nebraska, New Mexico), and Baja California. It is most likely to be found near water, such as wetlands, ditches, and marshes.

References

External links
USDA Plants Profile for Euthamia graminifolia (flat-top goldentop)
Calflora Database: Euthamia graminifolia (western flat topped goldenrod,  western goldenrod, western goldentop)
Jepson eFlora (TJM2) treatment of Euthamia graminifolia
University of Washington, Burke Museum: Euthamia graminifolia including photos
Calphotos Photos gallery, University of California: Euthamia graminifolia

occidentalis
Flora of Western Canada
Flora of the Northwestern United States
Flora of the Southwestern United States
Flora of Baja California
Flora of California
Flora of New Mexico
Natural history of the California chaparral and woodlands
Natural history of the Peninsular Ranges
Natural history of the Transverse Ranges
Plants described in 1840
Taxa named by Thomas Nuttall
Flora without expected TNC conservation status